Institute of Wood Science and Technology (IWST) is a Research institute situated in Bangalore in Karnataka. It works under the Indian Council of Forestry Research and Education (ICFRE) of the Ministry of Environment and Forests, Govt. of India.
It is recognized to be a Centre of Excellence for Sandalwood Research and Wood Science

Research and development 
The Institute has the following facilities and expertise for rendering services to user industry and Government and non-government organisations:
Xylarium with authentically identified Indian and foreign wood samples, with expertise to identify different timber species.
Authentic identification of wood-decaying fungi, insects, marine wood borers and foulers.
Cultures of wood-decaying fungi for reference and laboratory bioassay purposes.
Accelerated laboratory bioassay of candidate wood preservative chemicals against wood-deteriorating fungi and insects.
Testing of timber and timber products (untreated and treated) under land and marine conditions to evaluate their performance against biodeterioration.
Testing of timber and timber products for determining the strength properties.
Soil and plant analysis (for both micro- and macro-nutrients).
Mist chamber and green house for vegetative propagation.
Tissue culture laboratory.
Seed Technology Laboratory.
Vegetative Propagation Facilities.
Xenotest weatherometer for accelerated weathering experiments.
Timber seasoning kiln and expertise for setting up solar seasoning kiln.
Pressure-treatment plant for preservative-treatment of timber.
T.L.C.
G.L.C.
H.P.L.C.
UV, IR and Atomic Absorption Spectrophotometer
X-ray Fluorescence Analyzer
Flow Injection Analyzer
Nitrogen Analyzer
Bomb Calorimeter
FTIR
Biochamber for Entomological studies
Universal Testing Machine
Sophisticated Microscopes with Cameras and Video attachments and Image Analysis Systems and (m) SpectroFLUOROmeter
Workshop for processing wood samples for various experiments.
Chemical analysis of oils, gums, tannins and other non-wood forest products.
A seed orchard of sandal for supplying quality seeds.
Advice on nursery practices, silviculture and plant protection against fungal and insect attack.
Transfer of technology for improved agroforestry systems.
Advice on protection and management of mangrove ecosystems from biodeterioration point-of-view.
Advice on simple, inexpensive wood-preservation techniques (sap displacement method).
Advice on timber utilisation for catamaran, other fishing crafts and marine structures.
Model nursery at Nagaroor in collaboration with State Forest Department has been established.
A shore laboratory for studies on marine wood biodeterioration at Visakhapatnam has been established under World Bank aided Project. Additional land of 40 ha. has been acquired in Karnataka for establishment of germplasm bank, provenance, progeny trials, multiplication garden and seed orchards. A new ICFRE Research Centre with assistance from World Bank on a 100 acres land is being established at Hyderabad.

Research Divisions
Wood Properties and Engineered Wood
Wood Processing
Forest and Wood Protection
Chemistry of Forest Products
Tree Improvement and Genetics
Silviculture and Community Interface
Forest Biometry
Policy Research and Marketing
Forest Biodiversity (Overlapping Division)
Climate Change (Overlapping Division)

See also
 Indian Council of Forestry Research and Education
 Van Vigyan Kendra (VVK) Forest Science Centres

References

1938 establishments in India
Nature conservation in India
Forest research institutes
Forestry agencies in India
Forestry education in India
Forestry Research and Education
Indian Council of Forestry Research and Education
Ministry of Environment, Forest and Climate Change
Research institutes in Bangalore